Cellulomonas oligotrophica is a Gram-positive and motile bacterium from the genus Cellulomonas which has been isolated from soil from Kanagawa in Japan.

References

 

Micrococcales
Bacteria described in 2013